Perugini is an Italian surname. Notable people with the surname include:

Charles Edward Perugini (1839–1918), British painter 
Giovanni Perugini (born 1945), Italian athlete
Marcelo Perugini (born 1984), Argentine footballer
Stefano Perugini (born 1974), Italian motorcyclist
Salvatore Perugini (born 1978), Italian rugby player

Italian-language surnames